Events from the year 1866 in China.

Incumbents 
 Tongzhi Emperor (6th year)
 Regent: Empress Dowager Cixi

Events 

 Nian Rebellion
 Miao Rebellion (1854–73)
 Dungan Revolt (1862–77)
 Panthay Rebellion
 Tongzhi Restoration

Births 
 Luo Zhenyu or Lo Chen-yü (August 8, 1866 – May 14, 1940), courtesy name Shuyun (叔蘊), was a Chinese classical scholar, philologist, epigrapher, antiquarian and Qing loyalist.
 Sun Yat-sen (Zhongshan, Guangdong) Father of the Republic of China
 Chung Wing Kwong, revolutionary